Hong Kong Volunteer Company was a company of British-Chinese soldiers that escaped Japanese occupied Hong Kong, and served with the British in India and Burma during the Burma Campaign of World War II.

History
Following the surrender of Hong Kong in December 1941, several British-Chinese soldiers made their escape to Free China, and subsequently volunteered to go to India to join the British Army and fight the Japanese. The volunteer company was initially made up of 128 Chinese members of the Hong Kong Volunteer Defence Corp, 49 Chinese members of the British Army, as well as several members from the Air Transport Auxiliary, Air Raid Precautions, and other personnel that escaped from Japanese occupied Hong Kong to Free China. Escapees were assisted by the British Army Aid Group, and transported to Assam, and then to Calcutta by the Royal Air Force.

Lieutenant Colonel Mike Calvert, a British officer who previously commanded Chinese sappers in Hong Kong before 1941, called for volunteers from the escapees to serve with the Chindits. By February 1943, the Hong Kong Volunteer Company was put into service with the Chindits in Burma. They were later deployed to Japanese-occupied Malaya conducting special reconnaissance behind enemy lines.

See also 

 Hong Kong Chinese Regiment
 Royal Hong Kong Regiment

References

Further reading

External links 

Hong Kong in World War II
Military of Hong Kong under British rule
Military units and formations of the British Empire in World War II